The Nordrhein-Westfalen-Liga (North Rhine-Westphalia League; NRW-Liga) was the highest football league in the state of North Rhine-Westphalia (NRW) from 2008 to 2012. It was one of the eleven Oberliga groups in German football, the fifth tier of the German football league system.

With the reorganisation of the German league system in 2012, the NRW-Liga was disbanded once more as the Regionalliga West above it would then only contain clubs from North Rhine-Westphalia. The league was replaced by the three regional leagues, the Mittelrheinliga, Niederrheinliga and Oberliga Westfalen at this level.

Overview
The NRW-Liga was established in 2008 as a feeder league to the also new Regionalliga West. The new Oberliga is actually a merger of the Oberliga Nordrhein and the Oberliga Westfalen, giving the state of Nordrhein-Westfalen its first statewide league since the "old" Regionalliga West was disbanded in 1974. Due to the introduction of the 3. Liga in the same year, unlike the two old Oberliga groups who were set at tier four of the league system, the new league will be fifth tier.

The league will retain the four Verbandsliga groups of the two predecessor Oberliga groups as its feeder leagues, with the champion of each of those gaining direct promotion to the NRW-Liga. In turn, the top two teams of the NRW-Liga will gain promotion to the Regionalliga West.

The league was made up from a set quota of teams from each of the two predecessor Oberliga groups and the four Verbandsliga groups. While the top four clubs from Nordrhein and Westfalen were promoted to the Regionalliga, teams placed fifth to eleventh were headed go to the new NRW-Liga. The clubs placed twelve to eighteen were relegated to their Verbandsliga group. From the four Verbandsliga groups, the champions will each gain admittance, unless it would be a reserve team of a club already qualified for the Oberliga. In this case, the next eligible club would be admitted.

There was some dispute about the name of the league with the suggestion having been made to rather call it Oberliga West, a league of that name having already existed from 1947 to 1963, the "old" Oberliga West. The previous league of that name was a tier one league but covered the same region. It has however been decided to officially call it NRW-Liga, short for Nordrhein-Westfalen-Liga.

Additionally, the Verbandsliga groups were renamed Niederrheinliga, Mittelrheinliga and 2 groups of Westfalenliga.

With the end of the 2011-12 season, after four seasons of existence, the NRW-Liga was disbanded again. The place of the league as the fifth tier in North Rhine-Westphalia was then taken up by three regional leagues, the Mittelrheinliga and Niederrheinliga for the North Rhine region and the reformed Oberliga Westfalen for Westphalia. The top three clubs from the NRW-Liga gained direct entry to the Regionalliga while the teams placed fourth to seventh had to play-off with the four champions from the leagues below to determine four additional promoted teams.

Teams 2011–12 

Remaining in the NRW-Liga:
 Alemannia Aachen II
 SV Bergisch Gladbach 09
 MSV Duisburg II
 Schwarz-Weiß Essen
 Westfalia Herne
 VfB Homberg
 VfB Hüls
 Westfalia Rhynern
 SV Schermbeck
 Sportfreunde Siegen
 VfB Speldorf
 SSVg. Velbert

From the 3. Liga:
 Rot Weiss Ahlen

From the Regionalliga West:
 Arminia Bielefeld II

From the Verbandsliga Niederrhein:
 KFC Uerdingen 05

From the Verbandsliga Mittelrhein:
 Viktoria Köln

From the Verbandsliga Westfalen 1:
 TuS Dornberg

From the Verbandsliga Westfalen 2:
 TuS Erndtebrück

Champions and runners-up of the NRW-Liga

 1 The TSV Germania Windeck declined its right to promotion and withdrew to the Mittelrheinliga, with Fortuna Köln promoted instead.

Placings in the league
The final placings in the league:

 1 At the end of the 2012–13 season Germania Dattenfeld withdrew from the league.
 2 At the end of the 2009–10 season Rot-Weiß Essen II was relegated from the league because the first team had been relegated to the NRW-Liga.
 3 FC Wegberg-Beeck did not apply for a licence for the 2011–12 season and was relegated.
 4 The 1. FC Kleve withdrew from the league during the 2010–11 season.
 5 At the end of the 2009–10 season Bonner SC had to declare insolvency and withdrew to the tier seven Landesliga.
.

Key

References

Sources
 Deutschlands Fußball in Zahlen,  An annual publication with tables and results from the Bundesliga to Verbandsliga/Landesliga, publisher: DSFS
 Kicker Almanach,  The yearbook on German football from Bundesliga to Oberliga, since 1937, published by the Kicker Sports Magazine

External links 
 Das deutsche Fussball Archiv  Historic German league tables
  Weltfussball.de  Round-by-round results and tables of the NRW-Liga
 Niederrhein Football Association (FVN)  
 Mittelrhein Football Association (FVM)  
 Westfalen Football Association (FLVW)  

Nrw
Football competitions in North Rhine-Westphalia
2008 establishments in Germany
2012 disestablishments in Germany
Sports leagues established in 2008
Sports leagues disestablished in 2012